The World Figure Skating Championships ("Worlds") is an annual figure skating competition sanctioned by the International Skating Union. Medals are awarded in the categories of men's singles, women's singles, pair skating, and ice dance. Generally held in March, the World Championships are considered the most prestigious of the ISU Figure Skating Championships. With the exception of the Olympic title, a world title is considered to be the highest competitive achievement in figure skating.

The corresponding competition for junior-level skaters is the World Junior Championships. The corresponding competition for senior-level synchronized skating is the World Synchronized Skating Championships and for junior level the World Junior Synchronized Skating Championships.

History 
The Internationale Eislauf-Vereinigung (International Skating Union) formed in 1892 to govern international competition in speed and figure skating. The first championship, known as the Championship of the Internationale Eislauf-Vereingung, was held in Saint Petersburg, Russia, in 1896. There were four competitors and the winner of the event was Gilbert Fuchs.

The championships were presumed all-male since competitive skating was generally viewed as a male sport. However, there were no specific rules regarding the gender of competitors. In 1902, Madge Syers entered the championships, and won the silver medal. The 1903 ISU Congress considered gender issues, but passed no new rules. The 1905 ISU Congress established a second-class ladies' competition called the "ISU Championships", rather than the "World Championships" (winners were to be known as ISU champions not world champions). Men's and ladies' events were normally held separately. The first ladies' competition was held in Davos, Switzerland, in 1906; the event was won by Syers.

The first pairs competition was held in St. Petersburg in 1908, despite pairs competition being illegal in some countries and considered indecent. One such country was Japan, which had applied for the Winter Olympics in 1940. Early championships for both ladies and pairs, previously titled "ISU Championships", were retroactively given World Championship status in 1924.

In the early years, judges were invited by the host country and were often native. At the 1927 ladies' event in Oslo, Norway, three of the five judges were Norwegian; these three judges gave first place to Norwegian competitor Sonja Henie, while the Austrian and German judges placed defending champion Herma Szabo first. The controversial result stood, giving Henie her first world title, but the controversy led to the ISU introducing a new rule that allowed no more than one judge per country on the panel.

The 1930 Championships in New York City (the first to be held outside Europe) combined all three competitions into one event for the first time. Ice dancing entered the program officially in 1952, after having been an unofficial part of the championships since 1936.

Until 1959, national teams were allowed to field multiple competitors in each discipline; for example the United Kingdom entered six skaters in the ladies' singles competition in 1948, and five skaters represented the United States in each singles discipline in 1951. From 1960 onwards, the number of participants per country was limited to a maximum of three per discipline.

Compulsory figures were removed from the World Championships in 1991.

The 6.0 system was used for judging up to and including the 2004 event, after which the ISU Judging System was used from 2005 onward.

Every four years, because the World Championships take place around a month after the Winter Olympics, a large proportion of Olympic medalists have been absent from the competition. Many skaters need time to rest due to physical and mental exhaustion, and some Olympic medalists choose to cash in on their recent success by turning professional.

Cancellations
The World Figure Skating Championships have been cancelled 16 times in the competition's history: from 1915 through 1921 due to World War I; from 1940 through 1946 due to World War II; in 1961 as a result of the loss of the entire U.S. Figure Skating team in the crash of Sabena Flight 548; and in 2020 due to the COVID-19 pandemic.

The 2011 Championships, originally due to be held in Tokyo, Japan, were considered for cancellation after the Japan earthquake and tsunami, but were instead moved to Moscow, Russia.

The 2020 Championships, originally scheduled for Montreal, Canada, were cancelled by the Government of Quebec due to the COVID-19 pandemic. They were considering rescheduling the event for the autumn of 2020, but they were definitely cancelled on 16 April.

Eligibility and qualifying
Skaters may compete at the World Championships if they represent a member nation of the International Skating Union and are selected by their federation. Pairs and ice dance partnerships composed of skaters of different nationalities are not allowed to compete under two flags; they are required to choose one country and obtain the other country's permission.

Member nations select their entries according to their own criteria. Some countries rely on the results of their national championships while others have more varied criteria, which may include success at certain international events or specific technical requirements. All of the selected skaters must meet the ISU's age and TES requirements.

Age eligibility
Since 1996, skaters must be at least fifteen before July 1 of the previous year. Thus, to compete at the 2010 Worlds, skaters had to be 15 or older before July 1, 2009. A skater must turn 15 before it becomes July 1 in their place of birth – even an hour later is not accepted by the ISU. The World Junior Championships is the corresponding competition for skaters aged 13 to 19 (or up to 21 for male pair skaters and ice dancers) who are not old enough for senior Worlds or do not qualify. For a few years after the introduction of the 1996 age rules, a loophole existed for underage skaters who had medaled at Junior Worlds. The loophole was eventually eliminated. A few who had not medaled at Junior Worlds but had competed at senior Worlds before the introduction of the rules, such as Tara Lipinski of the United States, were allowed to continue competing in senior Worlds due to the Grandfather clause.

Minimum technical scores
Since 2010, only skaters who have reached minimum technical elements scores (TES) in the short and free programs at a prior international event are allowed to compete at the World Championships. The short and free scores may be attained at different international events in the ongoing or preceding season. After an ISU congress voted to eliminate the qualifying rounds, the TES minimums were raised for the 2013 World Championships.

Qualifying rounds
Because of the large number of entries at the World Championships, in some years the event included qualifying rounds for men and ladies. After the 2006 championships in Calgary, Canada, the ISU Congress voted to eliminate the qualifying round. It was later reintroduced and then eliminated again after the 2012 World Championships. After the short program, the top 24 single skaters and top 20 pairs advance to the free skate. In ice dance, the top 30 teams in the compulsory dance advanced to the original dance, and the top 24 after that segment advanced to the free dance.

Number of entries
Each national federation is entitled to send one entry per discipline. Depending on their results at the previous year's competition, some countries are allowed to send a second or third entry. If a country has only one entry, that skater/team must place in the top ten to earn a second entry and in the top two to earn three entries to next year's championships. If a country has two or three entries, their combined placement (best two) must be 28 or less to keep two entries for their country, and 13 or fewer to qualify three entries. All skaters who qualify for the free segment but place 16th or lower receive 16 placement points. All skaters who compete in the short segment but do not qualify for the free receive 18 placement points. Entries do not carry over and so countries must continue to earn their second or third spot every year.

There are exceptions if a skater is forced to withdraw in the middle of the competition due to a medical emergency or equipment problems.

Medalists

Men

Most titles:
 : (26) , (22) , (15) 
 : (21) , (16) , (13) 
 : (20) , (15) , (13) /

Women

Most titles:
 : (26) , (10) , (9) , 
 : (22) , (17) , (9) , //
 : (25) , (12) , (9) //

Pairs

Most titles:
 : (34) ///, (18) , (12) 
 : (30) /, (13) , (10) , 
 : (19) //, (17) , (12)

Ice dance

Most titles:
 : (29) ///, (17) , (8) 
 : (20) //, (14) , (11) 
 : (21) , (14) , (13) //

Records

*  Irina Rodnina won ten titles from 1969–1978, the first four times partnering with  Alexei Ulanov

Cumulative medal count

See also
 World Figure Skating Championships cumulative medal count
 Figure skating at the Olympic Games
 Major achievements in figure skating by nation
 World Junior Figure Skating Championships

References

Sources
 ISU World Figure Skating Championships results:
 1896–2003 Men Ladies Pairs Ice dance
 2001 2002 2003  2004 2005 2006 2007 2008 2009 2010 2011 2012 2013 2014 2015 2016 2017 2018 2019 2021 2022

External links

 International Skating Union

 
Worlds
Recurring sporting events established in 1896